Die Ärzte (also stylized die ärzte) is a best-of compilation by German rock band Die Ärzte, released exclusively in Japan. The band also has a studio album titled Die Ärzte.

Track listing 
(Songwriters listed in brackets)
 "Wie es geht" [How it's done] (Urlaub) – 3:58
 "Ein Lied für dich" [A song for you] (Urlaub) – 2:43
 "1/2 Lovesong" (González/Felsenheimer, González) – 3:52
 "Yoko Ono" (Urlaub) – 0:30
 "Rock Rendezvous" (Felsenheimer) – 4:08
 "Kann es sein?" [Can it be?] (González/Felsenheimer) – 2:47
 "Ignorama" (Felsenheimer, González/Felsenheimer) – 2:46
 "3-Tage-Bart" [Designer stubble, lit: 3-days-beard] (Felsenheimer, Urlaub/Urlaub) – 3:03
 "Super Drei" [Super three] (González, Urlaub/González, Felsenheimer, Urlaub) – 2:15
 "Der Graf" [The Count] (Felsenheimer) – 3:44
 "N 48.3" (Urlaub) – 2:51
 "No Future (Ohne neue Haarfrisur)" [Without a new haircut] (Urlaub) – 2:07
 "Vokuhila Superstar" [Mullet superstar] (Felsenheimer) – 4:59
 "Rebell" [Rebel] (Urlaub) – 3:51
 "Meine Freunde" [My friends] (Urlaub) – 1:47
 "Manchmal haben Frauen..." [Sometimes women have...] (Felsenheimer) – 4:13
 "Medusa-Man (Serienmörder Ralf)" [Serial killer Ralf] (Felsenheimer, Ludwig/Felsenheimer) – 5:56
 "Schunder-Song" (Urlaub) – 3:06
 "Grotesksong" [Grotesque song] (Urlaub) – 3:40
 "Hurra" [Hooray] (Urlaub) – 3:26
 "Die traurige Ballade von Susi Spakowski" [The sad ballad of Susi Spakowski] (Felsenheimer) – 4:01
 "Dauerwelle vs. Minipli" [Permanent wave vs. minipli] (Felsenheimer, González/Urlaub) – 0:53

Japanese track titles
  Koi no Kōhō
  Kimi e no uta
  Hāfu rabu songu
  Yōko Ono
  Rokku randebū
  Subarashiki rabu songu
  Igunorama
  Sekushī bushō hige
  Sūpā 3
  Dorakyura shayōzoku
  Jizokusei inkei bokki-shō
  Yoko wake nō fyūchā
  Ya-ba-i-yo kamigata
  Hankō-ki
  Homodachi S&M
  Toki ni onna wa
  Shiriaru kirā
  Fukushū suru wa ware ni ari
  Gurotesuku songu
  Banzai
  Sūjī Supakofusuki no Barādo
  Aipā VS Panchi

Song information 
 Tracks 9, 18, 20, 21 are from Planet Punk
 Tracks 8, 12, 13, 17, 22 are from Le Frisur
 Tracks 2, 3, 7, 10, 14, 15, 19 are from 13
 Tracks 1, 4–6, 11, 16 are from Runter mit den Spendierhosen, Unsichtbarer!

Personnel 
Farin Urlaub – guitar, vocals
Bela Felsenheimer – drums, vocals
Rodrigo González – bass, vocals
Diane Weigmann – additional vocals on 16

References

Die Ärzte compilation albums
2002 compilation albums